Dusmetovo (Düsmät) is a rural locality (a village) in Kucherbayevsky Selsoviet, Blagovarsky District, Bashkortostan, Russia. The population was 388 as of 2010. There is 1 street.

Geography 
Dusmetovo is located 34 km north of Yazykovo (the district's administrative centre) by road. Uly-Aryama is the nearest rural locality.

References 

Rural localities in Blagovarsky District